= Television Surveys =

1939 British television series

Television Surveys is a British television series which aired in 1939 on the BBC. It consists of live telecasts from different locations. One episode showed a railway junction, one episode showed a telephone exchange, while another episode showed Kensington gardens.

None of the episodes still exist, as methods to record live television were not developed until late 1947 and were used very rarely by the BBC until the mid-1950s.
